Skeletonization may refer to

Skeletonization, the final stage of death, for organisms with internal skeletons
Topological skeletonization, a digital imaging method.